869 Mellena (prov. designation:  or ) is a dark background asteroid from the central region of the asteroid belt. It was discovered on 9 May 1917, by astronomer Richard Schorr at the Bergedorf Observatory in Hamburg. It was named after Werner von Melle (1853–1937), mayor of Hamburg, who founded the discovering observatory.

Orbit and classification 

Mellena is a non-family asteroid of the main belt's background population when applying the hierarchical clustering method to its proper orbital elements. It orbits the Sun in the central asteroid belt at a distance of 2.1–3.3 AU once every 4 years and 5 months (1,610 days; semi-major axis of 2.69 AU). Its orbit has an eccentricity of 0.22 and an inclination of 8° with respect to the ecliptic.

Discovery 

Mellena was discovered by German astronomer Richard Schorr at the Bergedorf Observatory in Hamburg on 9 May 1917. On the following night, it was independently discovered by Max Wolf at Heidelberg Observatory on 10 May 1917. The Minor Planet Center, however, only credits the first discoverer. Schorr only discovered one more asteroid, 1240 Centenaria, and was honored with the naming of Mars-crosser 1235 Schorria, discovered by Wolf. Mellenas observation arc begins at Algiers Observatory in Northern Africa on 26 March 1930, almost 13 years after its official discovery observation at Bergedorf.

Naming 

This minor planet was named after Werner von Melle (1853–1937), who was the mayor of Hamburg, Germany, in 1915 and during 1918–1919. He promoted the establishment of the University of Hamburg and founded the Bergedorf–Hamburg Observatory where this minor planet was discovered. The  was also mentioned in The Names of the Minor Planets by Paul Herget in 1955.

Physical characteristics 

In both the Tholen- and SMASS-like taxonomy of the Small Solar System Objects Spectroscopic Survey (S3OS2) as well as in the SDSS-based taxonomy, Mellena is a common, carbonaceous C-type asteroid.

Rotation period 

In May 2010, a rotational lightcurve of Mellena was obtained from photometric observations by Robert Stephens at the Santana  and GMARS  observatories in California. Lightcurve analysis gave a well-defined rotation period of  hours with a brightness variation of  magnitude. Subsequent observations were taken by Andrea Ferrero at the Bigmuskie Observatory  in Mombercelli, Italy, and Larry Owings at the Barnes Ridge Observatory in California in June 2010, as well as by Albino Carbognani Astronomical at the OAVdA Observatory  in July 2010.

Diameter and albedo 

The Collaborative Asteroid Lightcurve Link derives an albedo of 0.0884 and a diameter of 18.64 kilometers based on an absolute magnitude of 11.9.

References

External links 
 Lightcurve Database Query (LCDB), at www.minorplanet.info
 Dictionary of Minor Planet Names, Google books
 Discovery Circumstances: Numbered Minor Planets (1)-(5000) – Minor Planet Center
 
 

000869
Discoveries by Richard Schorr
Named minor planets
19170509